The Florida black bear (Ursus americanus floridanus) is a subspecies of the American black bear that has historically ranged throughout most of Florida and the southern portions of Georgia, Alabama, and Mississippi. The large black-furred bears live mainly in forested areas and have seen recent habitat reduction throughout the state due to increased human development, as well as habitat modifications within bear habitat.

Description

Physical
Florida black bears are typically large-bodied with shiny black fur, a short tail and many have brown fur on their muzzles. Pelage color is consistently black in Florida, but summer molting of the guard hairs may cause them to look brown. A white chest patch, called a blaze, is found in about 30% of the population. Females generally weigh about half as much as males. Their feet have short, curved, non-retractable claws on each of the five digits. Black bears walk with the entire sole of their feet touching the ground. Bears use a pacing stride, where both legs on the same side move together so that the hind foot is placed in or slightly in front of the track of the forefoot; the smaller (inner) toe occasionally does not register in the track. The eyes are small, and the ears are round and erect.

Behavior
Black bears are shy and reclusive. They use various means to express their emotions including vocalizations, body language, and scent marking. They are mainly solitary, except when females have dependent cubs or during mating season. Although they are solitary mammals, they are not territorial, and typically do not defend their range from other bears, but will defend a food source from other bears. Black bears have good eyesight (especially at close range), acute hearing and an excellent sense of smell that is believed to be the best of any land mammal.

Reproduction
Female bears in Florida become sexually mature at three to four years of age. Breeding occurs from mid-June to mid-August, and coital stimulation is required in order to induce ovulation. Black bears experience delayed implantation, where fertilized eggs temporarily cease development after a few divisions, float free in the uterus and do not implant until late November or December. This adaptation allows bears to synchronize reproduction with annual food cycles. Lowered nutritional levels caused by poor acorn or berry production can result in delayed first breeding, decreased litter sizes, and increased incidence of barren females. Reproductive females enter winter dens in mid- to late December and emerge in early to mid-April after a mean denning period of 100 to 113 days. Actual gestation is 60 days, and cubs are born in late January to mid-February. Most studies in Florida have documented an average litter size of approximately two cubs, although greater productivity in Ocala National Forest (NF) in older females and females with previous litters has been noted. At birth, cubs weigh approximately 12 ounces and are partially furred but blind and toothless. Neonatal growth is rapid and cubs weigh six to eight pounds by the time they leave the den at about ten weeks of age. Cubs stay with their mother and may den with her the following year. Family dissolution usually occurs between May to July when cubs are 15 to 17 months old. Females generally form a home range overlapping their natal range, while young males disperse to new areas.

Habitat
Florida black bears live mainly in forested habitats, and are common in sand-pine scrub, oak scrub, upland hardwood forests and forested wetlands. Black bears in South Florida are the only American black bear subspecies to live in a subtropical region. To a lesser extent, it also inhabits dry prairie and tropical hammock.

Abundance and range
Before Florida was settled by Europeans, black bears occupied all of the Floridan mainland, and even the upper Florida Keys, with a population of around 11,000. The current range is 45% of the historic Florida range, as well as in southern Alabama, southern Georgia and southern Mississippi. Most major populations of Florida black bears live on or near public lands. These include Ocala National Forest, Big Cypress National Preserve, Apalachicola National Forest, Osceola National Forest and Okefenokee National Wildlife Refuge. A study of the Okefenokee-Osceola population found over 500 bears in each of the two study areas. There is no way to know the exact number of black bears that exist in Florida, although scientific methods provide a range of statistical estimates within which they are 95% confident. A statewide population estimate was conducted in 2014 and 2015 before the hunt. FWC estimated there were close to 4,000 bears from results of spatially explicit mark-recapture methods. They exist within seven subpopulations, which are genetically and geographically isolated. Bear range has expanded over the last several decades and the recent abundance estimates are higher than those created in 2002 but some citizens fear that habitat continues to be destroyed and believe that their numbers are dwindling.

Diet
Florida black bears are omnivores. Their diet consists of 80 percent plants, 15 percent insects, and 5 percent animal matter. Usually, the animal matter consists of carrion and is found by scavenging. Their diet varies greatly with the seasons, likely because many of their preferred species of flora and fauna are seasonal. In the spring, they mainly consume Sabal palmetto, Thalia geniculata, Sus scrofa, Bombus bimaculatus and Camponotus species. In the summer, they primarily eat Serenoa repens, Ilex glabra, Rubus species, Phytolacca rigida, Vaccinium species, Camponotus species, and Anisomorpha buprestoides. In the fall, they eat Serenoa repens, Ilex glabra, Nyssa biflora, Vespula species, Apis mellifera, and Dasypus novemcinctus.

Mortality

Vehicle-bear collisions are a threat to regional populations and the top known cause of death for Florida black bears. Since 2012, when accelerating habitat modifications began in key locations, over 230 bears have been killed each year on roadways statewide. The Florida Department of Transportation partnered with the FWC to examine the effects of roads on bear populations across the state. As a result, over 90 bear crossing signs and numerous wildlife underpasses are found statewide. Despite these efforts, road mortality has not decreased. Between 2014 and 2018, FWC killed 279 bears due to lack of enforcement of BearWise protocols such as feeding bears, whether intentionally or unintentionally.

Laws
There are numerous laws protecting the Florida black bear. Some examples of state protections include: it is illegal to feed bears (F.A.C. 68A-4.001), kill bears because they are deemed a 'nuisance' (F.A.C. 68A-9.010), or sell/purchase bear parts (F.A.C. 68A-12.004 (12)). The Bear Conservation Rule prohibits a 'take' of the subspecies, unless a permit is issued by the Florida Fish and Wildlife Conservation Commission (F.A.C. 68A-4.009).

Biological Status Review
On June 27, 2012, the Florida Fish and Wildlife Conservation Commission (FWC) delisted the Florida black bear, based on a peer-reviewed Biological Status Review. The report used the IUCN Red List criteria  to evaluate the species' risk of extinction. In addition, the 2012 Florida Black Bear Management Plan was approved and put into action to prevent the subspecies from being listed in the future.

While the Florida black bear was removed from the state list of threatened species, the Bear Conservation Rule (68A-4.009) was adopted at the same time, providing continued protections to the species.

Florida black bear hunting
The Florida Game and Fresh Water Fish Commission closed bear hunting in all of Florida, except Apalachicola National Forest and Baker and Columbia counties (including Osceola National Forest) in 1974 and closed those remaining areas in 1994.
 
In February 2015, Florida Fish and Wildlife Conservation Commissioners directed staff to develop a limited, regulated bear hunt. After numerous meetings (public and Commission), the Florida Fish and Wildlife Conservation Commission finalized details of a limited bear hunt in September 2015.

The purpose of a regulated, limited bear hunt is to provide hunting opportunities per the North American Model of Wildlife Conservation. Permits were available to residents and non-residents from Aug. 3 to Oct. 23, 2015, and during that period 3,778 were sold. This number was more than the estimated number of bears at the time.

The bear hunt took place in four of the seven subpopulations (Apalachicola, Osceola, Ocala, and Big Cypress) on October 24 and 25, 2015. The total kill for the four subpopulations (or Bear Management Units (BMU)) open during the 2015 bear hunt was 304 bears. The breakdown by subpopulation is as follows:
• Apalachicola (East Panhandle BMU) = 114 bears
• Ocala (Central BMU) = 143 bears
• Osceola (North BMU) = 25 bears
• Big Cypress (South BMU) = 22 bears
 
In June 2016, FWC Commissioners voted 4-3 to postpone bear hunting. In April 2017, FWC Commissioners directed staff to bring back a revised Florida Black Bear Management Plan in two years to include more reference to hunting. The objective was to garner public support for bear hunting in the interim.

Discouraging bears from human-occupied areas
Due to the increased number of people moving to Florida, bear sightings have been increasing in Florida  in recent years and the Florida Fish and Wildlife Conservation Commission  has posted a number of actions that can be taken to discourage bears from lingering in human-occupied areas. Most important has been the prevention of allowing access to food sources such as those maintained for pets or livestock. In residential areas, keeping garbage cans in garages or putting locks on lids, as well as discouraging the use of outdoor feeders and keeping pet foods outdoors have met with success. Electric fences have also proven successful as a means to secure perimeters from bear incursions. Keeping ripe fruit and garden vegetables picked in suburban residential and rural residential areas and cleaning outdoor grills have also reduced unplanned human-black bear interactions. Motion-activated alarms have also been found to be effective in scaring bears away.

Legislative action
On December 11, 2015, then-state Senator (now-U.S. Congressman) Darren Soto (D-FL) filed, along with co-sponsors state Senators Eleanor Sobel (D-FL), Joseph Abruzzo (D-FL), Dwight Bullard (D-FL), and Jeff Clemens (D-FL), S.B. 1096, Florida Black Bears. An identical House bill to S.B. 1096, H.B. 1055, was filed on December 29, 2015 by Representative Mark S. Pafford (D-FL) and co-sponsored by Representatives Dwight Dudley (D-FL) and Ed Narain (D-FL). These bills would require the Florida Fish and Wildlife Conservation Commission, the Florida Department of Agriculture and Consumer Services, and the Florida Department of Environmental Protection to create an account within the Non-Game Wildlife Trust Fund to assist with funding for bear-resistant trash cans and take certain measures to conserve bear habitat. In addition, the bills would require conservation efforts including: changing schedules for controlled burns in bear habitat, permanently banning the harvest of saw palmetto berries, and ban sales of timbering rights to acorn producing oaks. The mention of prohibiting the sale of timber rights on state land was in response to land usage in the Florida Black Bear Management Plan  which also included grain farming and cattle ranching on state land. The bills would also require a panel of five biologists and wildlife ecologists appointed by the senate to oversee the Black Bear Habitat Restoration Act.  Neither bill however, was heard in their first committee of reference and subsequently died in committee.

H.B. 491, sponsored by Representative Amy Mercado (D-FL), was filed in the House on January 24, 2017.  It was referred to the Natural Resources and Public Lands Subcommittee, Agriculture and Natural Resources Appropriations Subcommittee and the Government Accountability Committee on February 6, 2017. The bill was not heard in its first committee of reference and subsequently died in committee.  S.B. 1304, sponsored by Senator Linda Stewart (D-FL), was filed in the Senate on February 28, 2017.  It was referred to the Committee on Environmental Preservation and Conservation, the Appropriations Subcommittee on the Environment and Natural Resources and Appropriations. The bill was found favorable with a Committee Substitute by the Committee on Environmental Preservation and Conservation on April 19, 2017. The bill died in its second committee of reference on May 8, 2017. The bills are a revised version of the Florida Black Bear Habitat Restoration Act.

On December 6, 2018, state Senator Linda Stewart filed S.B. 134, Florida Black Bears.  It was referred to the Environment and Natural Resources Committee, Agriculture Committee, Criminal Justice Committee, and Rules Committee on January 10, 2019.  This bill would prohibit the Fish and Wildlife Conservation Commission from allowing the recreational hunting of Florida black bears mothering cubs that weigh less than 100 pounds under a Florida black bear hunting permit; specify a penalty for the unlawful harvesting of saw palmetto berries on state lands; prohibit prescribed burns in certain designated habitats during specified times.  This bill was not heard in its first committee of reference and subsequently died in committee.

On February 13, 2019, state Senator Linda Stewart filed S.B. 988, Florida Black Bears/ Endangered and Threatened Species Act. It was referred to Environment and Natural Resources Committee and Rules Committee on February 22, 2019.  This bill would request the Florida Fish and Wildlife Conservation Commission to consider relisting the Florida black bear as a threatened species under the Endangered and Threatened Species Act.  This bill was not heard in its first committee of reference and subsequently died in committee.

On February 18, 2019, state Senator Jason Pizzo filed S.B. 1150, Wildlife Protection.  It was referred to Environment and Natural Resources Committee, Criminal Justice Committee, and Rules Committee on February 28, 2019.  This bill would prohibit the import, sale, purchase, and distribution of ivory articles and rhinoceros horns; provide that it is unlawful to take, possess, injure, shoot, collect, or sell Florida black bears; provide that the illegal taking, possession, injuring, shooting, collecting, or selling of Florida black bears is a Level Four violation, which is subject to criminal and civil penalties.  This bill was not heard in its first committee of reference and subsequently died in committee.

Endangered Species Act petition
On March 17, 2016, various conservation groups throughout Florida led by the Center for Biological Diversity petitioned the U.S. Department of Interior to request that the Florida black bear be listed on the Federal Endangered Species Act. However, on April 19, 2017, U.S. Fish and Wildlife Services released a final decision regarding the Endangered Species Act petition which denied the change in status.  This decision was similar to the results of the petition submitted by Inge Hutchinson on June 11, 1990, which was declined in lieu of state actions to protect the Florida black bear.  The federal government deemed that federal action would not be necessary so long as the state was offering sufficient protective measures.

References

American black bears
Carnivorans of North America
Fauna of the Southeastern United States
Mammals of the United States
Natural history of Florida
Natural history of Alabama
Natural history of Georgia (U.S. state)
Natural history of Mississippi